Arroio Grande ("big rivulet") is a district of the municipality of Santa Maria, in the Brazilian state of Rio Grande do Sul. It is situated in the north portion of Santa Maria. The district's seat is located 18 km (11,18 miles) from Downtown Santa Maria. The district is known as the portal to a wave of Italian immigration in the late 1870s.

The district of Arroio Grande owns an area of 130.71 km² that is equivalent to 7.30% of the municipality of Santa Maria that is 1791.65 km².

History 
The district was created in 1988 by municipal law 3099/88 of 1988.

Limits 

The district limits with the districts of Palma and Sede, and with the municipalities of Silveira Martins, Júlio de Castilhos and Itaára.

Neighbourhoods 
The district of Arroio Grande is divided in the following bairros, that in English is equivalent to neighbourhoods:
 Arroio Grande;

Roads and railway 
 The América Latina Logística railway crosses by the south of the district, in the district of Sede and by a small part of the boundary of the two districts.
 Highways in the district:
 RSC-287: In the south perimeter of the district.
 RS-511: Also known by "Estrada Municipal Norberto José Kipper" and is the main highway in the district.

See also 
 District of Arroio Grande, in Portuguese Wikipedia.

References

External links 
Site oficial da Prefeitura de Santa Maria

Districts of Santa Maria, Rio Grande do Sul